Eduardo Schwank was the defending champion, but he chose not to play this year.
Benjamin Becker won in the final 7–6(3), 6–1, against Izak van der Merwe.

Seeds

Draw

Final four

Top half

Bottom half

References
 Main Draw
 Qualifying Draw

Trofeo Paolo Corazzi - Singles
Trofeo Paolo Corazzi